Henry A. Stradling, A.S.C. (September 1, 1901 – February 14, 1970) was an American cinematographer with more than 130 films to his credit.

His uncle Walter Stradling, son Harry Stradling Jr. and godson Gerald Perry Finnerman were also cinematographers.

Early career
Stradling was born in Newark, New Jersey (some sources suggest Nesen, Germany, or England), the nephew of cameraman Walter Stradling (died 1918) who had worked with Mary Pickford. Confined to two-reelers in Hollywood, he left for France and Germany in the early 1930s.  He made contributions to several Jacques Feyder films, Le Grand Jeu (1934), La Kermesse héroïque (Carnival in Flanders) (1935), Die Klugen Frauen (1936) and Knight Without Armour (1937), his first under producer Alexander Korda in England. Other English films include Action for Slander (1937), The Divorce of Lady X (1938), South Riding, The Citadel (1938), Pygmalion (1938), The Lion Has Wings, Jamaica Inn (1939), Q Planes (1939).

Hollywood

Stradling moved to the United States at the beginning of World War II. Alfred Hitchcock engaged him for Mr. & Mrs. Smith (1941) and Suspicion (1941). Stradling's last four films starred Barbra Streisand, including her Oscar-winning debut Funny Girl.

During his career, he photographed Marlene Dietrich, Vivien Leigh, Katharine Hepburn, Audrey Hepburn, Jean Simmons, Esther Williams, Lucille Ball, Hedy Lamarr, Rosalind Russell, Kim Novak, Judy Garland, and Barbra Streisand.

Stradling died halfway through production of The Owl and the Pussycat in Hollywood, California.

Selected filmography

References

External links
 
 1920 passport photo of Henry A. Stradling aged 19

1901 births
1970 deaths
American cinematographers
Best Cinematographer Academy Award winners
Artists from Newark, New Jersey